Winklarn is a market town and municipality in the district of Schwandorf in Bavaria, Germany. In 2006, Winklarn had 1,446 inhabitants. Winklarn lies in the Upper Palatinate. In the North of Winklarn, there is a large forest, the so-called Frauenstein.

Winklarn was first mentioned in 1270. 

In 1635, 229 inhabitants died of the plague. After the remaining inhabitants prayed to St. Sebastian, the Black Death stopped. Since this time, every year St. Sebastian's Day is celebrated specially due to a promise of the inhabitants at that time.

In 1822, a large fire devastated the centre of Winklarn. Afterwards, the large rectangular market place was built.

In 1972, the former communities Muschenried, Haag, Schneeberg, and Pondorf were incorporated.

Until 1986, there was also a train station. In Winklarn, there is a kindergarten and a primary school.

References

Schwandorf (district)